Arthur Lock Kemp (15 December 1868 – 1 March 1929) was an English cricketer who played first-class cricket in two matches for Middlesex, one each in 1890 and 1894. He was born at Kentish Town in London and died at Monken Hadley, Hertfordshire.

References

1868 births
1929 deaths
English cricketers
Middlesex cricketers